Masekela is the eleventh studio album by South African jazz trumpeter Hugh Masekela released via Uni Records label in 1969.

Background
The album was recorded in Los Angeles, possibly between 12 and 30 September 1968. Masekela performs mostly his own compositions. The tracks "Mace and Grenades" and "Gold" were later included on his 2004 album Still Grazing.

The track "Mace and Grenades" was issued as a single with "Riot" as the B-side.

Track listing
All tracks composed by Masekela unless indicated otherwise.

Personnel
The personnel probably included:
Hugh Masekela – trumpet, vocals
Wayne Henderson – trombone
Al Abreu – saxophone
Wilton Felder – saxophone
Bill Henderson – piano
Arthur Adams – guitar
Henry Franklin – bass
Chuck Carter – drums
Barry Feinstein – photography, cover

References

External links

1969 albums
Uni Records albums
Hugh Masekela albums
Albums produced by Stewart Levine